Dysprosium chloride may refer to:

 Dysprosium(II) chloride (dysprosium dichloride), DyCl2
 Dysprosium(III) chloride (dysprosium trichloride), DyCl3